Lambton—Kent—Middlesex is a provincial electoral district in southwestern Ontario, Canada. It elects one member to the Legislative Assembly of Ontario.

It was created in 1999 from parts of Lambton, Chatham—Kent and Middlesex when ridings were redistributed to match their federal counterparts.

From 1999 to 2007 the riding consisted of the municipalities of Lambton Shores, Warwick, Brooke-Alvinston, Dawn-Euphemia, Southwest Middlesex, Newbury, Adelaide Metcalfe, Strathroy-Caradoc, Oneida 41, Chippewas of the Thames First Nation 42, Plympton-Wyoming, Enniskillen, Petrolia, Oil Springs, Walpole Island 46, Chatham-Kent north of the Thames River and not including the former city of Chatham, and  the southwest third of North Middlesex.

In 2007, the riding was redistributed, and it lost Plympton-Wyoming, Enniskillen, Petrolia and Oil Springs while it gained the rest of North Middlesex, Lucan Biddulph and Middlesex Centre.

Considered a bellwether or swing riding, the area tends to attract frequent visits by party leaders during elections. The political instability of the riding is largely attributed to the diversity of political and religious opinion within its borders. A rural riding by nature, the issues of gun control and abortion arise frequently during town-hall meetings and elections. At the same time the largely Liberal areas of Strathroy and Petrolia tend to balance the more conservative rural regions. The Ontario New Democratic Party (NDP) also has pockets of support in Wallaceburg.

During the 1999 election, the riding attracted controversy as it included Ipperwash Provincial Park - the sight of a 1995 stand-off between the Ontario Provincial Police and native land protesters known as the Ipperwash Crisis. Political events in the riding became frequent targets for further protests by natives unhappy with the Conservative Government's handling of the Ipperwash Affair and the associated shooting death of protester Dudley George. Despite the controversy, Progressive Conservative MPP Marcel Beaubien was re-elected to the Legislative Assembly of Ontario, despite strong campaigns by Liberal former municipal politician Larry O'Neil and New Democratic candidate Jim Lee, then-President of United Automobile Workers Local 251.

Members of Provincial Parliament
This riding has elected the following members of the Legislative Assembly of Ontario:

Election results

2007 electoral reform referendum

Sources

Elections Ontario Past Election Results
Map of riding for 2018 election

Ontario provincial electoral districts
Chatham-Kent
Strathroy-Caradoc